Olivier Delaître and Tim Henman were the defending champions, but lost in second round to tournament runners-up Paul Haarhuis and Sandon Stolle.

Wayne Ferreira and Yevgeny Kafelnikov won the title by defeating Paul Haarhuis and Sandon Stolle 6–3, 2–6, 6–1 in the final.

Seeds

Draw

Finals

Top half

Bottom half

References
 Official Results Archive (ATP)
 Official Results Archive (ITF)

Doubles